Rasmus Storm's Notebook is a handwritten collection of tunes written in the 1760s by Rasmus Storm. It is one of the earliest and most important collections of Danish traditional music. Storm was a Danish fiddler and dancing master (teacher) born in 1733 on the Island of Funen. He was the son of an indentured peasant and worked as an assistant to a merchant. He began compiling his tunebook around 1760, but it is unknown where he learned the tunes. Among the tunes are minuets, polskas, bourrées, marches and rigaudons – as well as otherwise unknown dance types such as "dantz" and "serras" and several folk melodies.  Today the notebook is kept by the Danish Ethnological collection.

References

Manuscripts
1760s books
Danish folk music
Baroque dance
Renaissance dance
Music sources